Benjamin Markley Boyer (January 22, 1823 – August 16, 1887) was a Democratic member of the U.S. House of Representatives from Pennsylvania.

Benjamin M. Boyer was born in Pottstown, Pennsylvania.  He graduated from the University of Pennsylvania at Philadelphia in 1841.  He studied law, was admitted to the bar in 1844 and practiced.  He was deputy attorney general of Montgomery County, Pennsylvania, from 1848 to 1850.

In 1864 he was elected a Representative from Pennsylvania to the Thirty-Ninth Congress as a Democrat, and was re-elected to the Fortieth Congress. He was not a candidate for renomination in 1868.

In 1866 he accepted stocks from Thomas Durant in the early stages of the Crédit Mobilier scandal. He was appointed judge of Montgomery County Court in 1882 and served until his death in Norristown, Pennsylvania, in 1887.  Interment in West Laurel Hill Cemetery in Bala Cynwyd, Pennsylvania.

References

Sources

The Political Graveyard

1823 births
1887 deaths
Pennsylvania lawyers
Pennsylvania state court judges
University of Pennsylvania alumni
People from Pottstown, Pennsylvania
19th-century American politicians
Burials at West Laurel Hill Cemetery
Burials in Pennsylvania
Democratic Party members of the United States House of Representatives from Pennsylvania
19th-century American judges
19th-century American lawyers